Pandiyan may refer to: 
Pandyan dynasty, which ruled South India from pre-historic times until end of the 15th century
Pandiyan (actor), Indian actor
Pandiyan (film), 1992 Indian film by S. P. Muthuraman.
Pandya (surname), Indian surname